DoDonPachi II: Bee Storm  ( DoDonPachi Tsū;  Bee Storm) is a vertically scrolling bullet hell shoot 'em up developed by IGS and published by Capcom in 2001.

Gameplay 

Upon starting the game, players are greeted with 3 game modes; Practice, Combat, and Internet Rank. Combat takes the player through all 6 stages, facing a boss at the end. Practice mode shortens the experience to 4 stages, and Internet Rank is identical to Combat Mode in terms of game length. However, upon the game ending, you will be given a code you can enter on the official IGS website, where you will be able to view high scores achieved by you and other players.

There are 3 different ship types you can choose from; a narrow shot with fast movement, a wide shot with slow movement, and a shot that moves alongside the ship with medium movement. Upon selecting a ship, you will be given the choice of playing with Bombs or an Energy Meter. Bomb Style will give you 5 bombs with every life, which you can activate by pushing the B button. This amount can be replenished with bomb items that can be obtained by destroying enemies in stages. Energy Style plays differently from Bomb Style; By grazing bullets fired at enemies, the player builds up a meter located at the bottom of the screen. When the meter is filled up, the player can push the B button to fire a super powerful laser, cancelling bullets and rapidly increasing the combo gauge. After activating the laser, the gauge would empty, and it would have to be filled up again. In energy mode, bomb items can be picked up for 20,000 points.

The combo system as seen in Donpachi and Dodonpachi returns in Beestorm, but it is changed from those games. Instead of the combo resetting if enough time passes without defeating enemies, the combo rapidly decreases until it reaches zero. In addition, firing the laser close to large enemies and bosses would rapidly increase the combo meter. Combos can be built up by defeating enemies with shot or laser attacks, or by attacking large enemies with the laser.

In addition to 6 stages and bosses, a secret stage containing the true final boss can be accessed if the player obtains 400 million points, with no second loop. Bombs, deaths, and bee medals do not contribute to finding the boss. Bee medals that would normally contribute to game completion give a fixed value of 20,000 points.

Unlike other games in the Dodonpachi series, plot details are very vague and do not connect to any games before or after it.

Development
Dodonpachi II, despite the name, was not developed by Cave. Instead, it was developed by Taiwan-based IGS (or International Games System). IGS obtained the license to the Dodonpachi name for a new game to release on IGS' new Poly Game Master hardware. The game was first sold in Asian territories like China and Korea before being bought over to Japan.

Around this time, Cave was considering leaving the arcade business due to their decline in popularity and difficulties finding publishers for their work (Progear no Arashi would have been their final game). However, the success of Dodonpachi II convinced Cave to continue their arcade game business, developing Dodonpachi Daioujou a year later.

DoDonPachi II supports Japanese, Chinese, English and Korean. The interface language depends on the protection chip inside the game cartridge, which provides region information. In addition, the game's title, stage names and boss names are also altered depending on the region.

Music
A soundtrack for the first 2 DoDonPachi games was released by Scitron Digital Content.

Reception

In Japan, Game Machine listed DoDonPachi II on their August 1, 2001 issue as being the eighth most-successful arcade game at the time.

References

External links

DoDonPachi II at Arcade History
DonDonPachi II at STG Wiki 

2001 video games
Arcade video games
Arcade-only video games
DonPachi
Vertically scrolling shooters
International Games System games
PolyGame Master games
Shoot 'em ups
Bullet hell video games
Video games developed in Taiwan
Video game sequels
Vertically-oriented video games